The Ministry of Defence of the Republic of Croatia ( or MORH) is the ministry in the Government of Croatia which is in charge of the nation's military. It is Croatia's ministry of defence. The ministry was established in 1990.

Structure
Elements in the ministry's structure are:
 Defence Minister and Deputy Minister
 Minister's Cabinet
 Chief Secretariat
 Sector for Administrative and Legal Affairs
 Croatian Armed Forces General Staff
 Defence Inspectorate
 Military Security and Intelligence Agency
 Independent Sector for Public Procurement
 Independent Department for Public Affairs and Publishing
 Independent Section for Internal Auditing
 Independent Department for Military Air Traffic
 Independent Department for supporting Military Ordinary in Croatia
 Defence Policy Directorate and the assigned Assistant Minister
 Defence Policy Sector
 International Defence Cooperation and Security Sector
 Human Resources Directorate and the assigned Assistant Minister
 Human Resources Management Sector
 Human Resources Management Support Sector
 Material Resources Directorate and the assigned Assistant Minister
 Armament Sector
 Property, Environmental Protection and Construction Sector
 Information Systems, Finance and Budget Directorate and the assigned Assistant Minister
 Sector for Information Communication Systems
 Program Analysis, Finance and Budget Sector

List of ministers

Political parties:

 (13)
 (2)
 (1)

(*) Ministers of Defence who held the post of Deputy Prime Minister of Croatia while in office.

(**) Incumbent's time in office last updated: .

See also
 Armed Forces of Croatia

References

External links

 Ministry of Defence of the Republic of Croatia Official website

Croatia
Defence
Croatia, Defence
Military of Croatia
Croatia, Defence
1990 establishments in Croatia
Croatia
Croatia